Kamalia Wildlife Park is a wildlife park located in Kamalia, Punjab, Pakistan.

References

Wildlife parks in Pakistan
Toba Tek Singh District